The 2008 WNBL Finals was the postseason tournament of the WNBL's 2007–08 season. The Canberra Capitals were the two-time defending champions but were defeated by Dandenong in the Semi-finals. The Adelaide Lightning won their fifth WNBL championship with a 92–82 win over the Sydney Uni Flames.

Standings

Bracket

Semi-finals

(1) Adelaide Lightning vs. (2) Sydney Uni Flames

(3) Canberra Capitals vs. (4) Dandenong Rangers

Preliminary final

(1) Adelaide Lightning vs. (4) Dandenong Rangers

Grand Final

(1) Adelaide Lightning vs. (2) Sydney Uni Flames

Rosters

References 

2008 Finals
2007-08
Women's National Basketball League Finals
2007–08 in Australian basketball
Aus
basketball
basketball